Liechtensteiner Vaterland (lit. "Liechtenstein Fatherland") is the largest daily newspaper in Liechtenstein. Published by Vaduzer Medienhaus AG, Liechtensteiner Vaterland is the official newspaper of the Patriotic Union party.

References

External links 

German-language newspapers published in Europe
Publications established in 1933
Mass media in Liechtenstein